Hernando de Ramírez y Sánchez (1580 – April 11, 1652) was a Roman Catholic prelate who served as Bishop of Panamá (1641–1652).

Biography
Hernando de Ramírez y Sánchez was born in Arroyo de la Luz, Spain and ordained a priest in the Order of the Most Holy Trinity. On June 1, 1641, Pope Urban VIII, appointed him Bishop of Panamá. On February 9, 1642, he was consecrated bishop by Diego Castejón Fonseca, Bishop Emeritus of Lugo with Miguel Avellán, Auxiliary Bishop of Toledo and Timoteo Pérez Vargas, Archbishop Emeritus of Ispahan as Co-Consecrators. He served as Bishop of Panamá until his death on April 11, 1652.

While bishop, he was the principal consecrator of Alonso de Briceño, Bishop of Nicaragua.

References

External links and additional sources
 (for Chronology of Bishops) 
 (for Chronology of Bishops) 

1580 births
1652 deaths
Bishops appointed by Pope Urban VIII
Trinitarian bishops
17th-century Roman Catholic bishops in Panama
Roman Catholic bishops of Panamá